The Hare Hills Tuff is a formation cropping out in Newfoundland.

References

Volcanism of Newfoundland and Labrador